Igor Morozov may refer to:
 Igor Morozov (baritone) (born 1948), Russian-Ukrainian opera singer
 Igor Morozov (politician) (born 1956), Russian politician
 Igor Morozov (footballer) (born 1989), Estonian professional footballer